The Legal Aid and Advice Act 1949 was a British Act of Parliament which extended the welfare state so that those unable to pay for a solicitor were able to access free legal help. It set up the first ever state funded legal aid system in the UK. Its precursor was the Poor Prisoners Defence Act of 1930 which introduced criminal legal aid for appearances in magistrates’ courts. It received Royal assent on 30 July 1949 creating one system for claiming legal aid in England and Wales. The assistance was means tested but freely available to people of “small or moderate means”. It was described by Lord Beecham as "one of the great pillars of the post war welfare state",

This Act's scope was substantially reduced following the contested Legal Aid, Sentencing and Punishment of Offenders Act 2012.

References 

United Kingdom Acts of Parliament 1949
Acts of the Parliament of the United Kingdom concerning legal services